Coventry City Council elections are generally held three years out of every four, with a third of the council being elected each time. Coventry City Council is the local authority for the metropolitan borough of Coventry in the West Midlands, England. Since the last boundary changes in 2004, 54 councillors have been elected from 18 wards.

Political control
From 1889 to 1974 Coventry was a county borough, independent of any county council. Under the Local Government Act 1972 it had its territory enlarged and became a metropolitan borough, with West Midlands County Council providing county-level services. The first election to the reconstituted city council was held in 1973, initially operating as a shadow authority before coming into its revised powers on 1 April 1974. West Midlands County Council was abolished in 1986 and Coventry became a unitary authority. Political control of the council since 1974 has been held by the following parties:

Leadership

The role of Lord Mayor of Coventry is largely ceremonial, with political leadership provided by the leader of the council. The leaders since 1974 have been:

Council elections
1998 Coventry City Council election
1999 Coventry City Council election
2000 Coventry City Council election
2002 Coventry City Council election
2003 Coventry City Council election
2004 Coventry City Council election (whole council elected after boundary changes took place)
2006 Coventry City Council election
2007 Coventry City Council election
2008 Coventry City Council election
2010 Coventry City Council election
2011 Coventry City Council election
2012 Coventry City Council election
2015 Coventry City Council election
2016 Coventry City Council election
2018 Coventry City Council election
2019 Coventry City Council election
2021 Coventry City Council election
2022 Coventry City Council election

Borough result maps

By-election results

1993-1997

1997-2001

2001-2005

2006-2011

2016–2021

2022–2026

References

By-election results

External links
Coventry City Council
The City of Coventry (Electoral Changes) Order 2003

 
Elections in Coventry
Local government in Coventry
Council elections in the West Midlands (county)
Coventry